The UMass Lowell River Hawks are the NCAA Division I intercollegiate athletics teams representing the University of Massachusetts Lowell in Lowell, Massachusetts, United States. Members of the America East Conference for all sports (except the men's ice hockey team, which competes in Hockey East). UMass Lowell sponsors teams in eight men's and nine women's NCAA sanctioned sports. Prior to transitioning to Division I in 2013, the River Hawks competed in the Northeast-10 Conference in Division II.

Teams 

The University of Massachusetts Lowell participates in 16 sports at the Division I level. On July 1, 2013, 14 of UMass Lowell's Division II teams moved up to Division I, joining the America East Conference. The River Hawks formerly competed in the Northeast-10 Conference at the Division II level. Past champions include the 1988 men's basketball team, the 1991 men's cross country team, the ice hockey team (three times) and the field hockey team twice (2005, 2010). The 2010 field hockey team finished its season with a perfect 24-0 record. The university added men's and women's lacrosse for the 2014-2015 academic year.

The university's men's hockey team plays in the Hockey East Association and plays its home games at the Tsongas Center at UMass Lowell. In 2013, the men's hockey team won the Hockey East regular-season and tournament championships and advanced to the NCAA Division I Championship "Frozen Four," all for the first time in the university's history. The men's hockey team repeated as Hockey East champions in 2014 while advancing to the NCAA Division I Men's Ice Hockey Championship for the third straight year and sixth time overall. Goalie Connor Hellebuyck is the only Hockey East player to receive the league tournament's Most Valuable Player Award in two consecutive years, earning the honor in 2013 and 2014.

The nickname "River Hawks" came about during the school's transition from the University of Lowell to UMass Lowell and was inspired by the campus's location along the Merrimack River. The University of Lowell's nickname was the Chiefs, which was abandoned in favor of the current name. A campus-wide poll was conducted for student input and final candidates included the Ospreys and the Raging Rapids, according to the Connector student newspaper.

Discontinued sports

Football
ULowell started playing division III collegiate football in 1980. Under coach Dennis Scannell UMass Lowell enjoyed a 35-4 run from 1988–91, making the 1991 NCAA Division III Football Championship playoffs, losing to Union in the first round. UMass Lowell made the move to division II as a member of the Northeast-10 Conference in 2000. Due to budget cuts and lack of competitiveness on the field, the administration cut the sport in 2003.

Facilities

Notable Athletes

 Craig Charron, former professional ice hockey player
 Jeff Daw, Former NHL player with the Colorado Avalanche
 Shelagh Donohoe, Olympic Silver Medalist in Women's Rowing
 Christian Folin, NHL player with the Los Angeles Kings
 Scott Fankhouser, Former NHL player with the Atlanta Thrashers
 Ron Hainsey, NHL player with the Toronto Maple Leafs, Montreal Canadiens, Columbus Blue Jackets, Atlanta Thrashers, Winnipeg Jets, Carolina Hurricanes, and Pittsburgh Penguins.
 Connor Hellebuyck, NHL player with the Winnipeg Jets
 Carter Hutton, NHL player with the Buffalo Sabres
 Ben Holmstrom, NHL hockey player with the Philadelphia Flyers
 Dean Jenkins, Former NHL hockey player with the Los Angeles Kings
 Greg Koehler, Former NHL hockey player with the Carolina Hurricanes
 Mark Kumpel, Member of the 1984 U.S. Olympic Hockey team and former NHL player with the Quebec Nordiques and the Winnipeg Jets
 Mike LaValliere, Former Major League Baseball catcher for the Philadelphia Phillies, St. Louis Cardinals, Pittsburgh Pirates, and Chicago White Sox. Recipient of the 1987 NL Gold Glove Award at catcher. 
 Craig MacTavish, Former NHL player with Boston Bruins, Edmonton Oilers, St. Louis Blues, Philadelphia Flyers and New York Rangers and former coach of the Edmonton Oilers, where he serves as senior vice president.
 Bill Morrell, Former Major League Baseball pitcher for the Washington Senators and NY Giants.
 Jon Morris, Former NHL player with the New Jersey Devils, San Jose Sharks and Boston Bruins
 Dwayne Roloson, NHL player with the Tampa Bay Lightning, New York Islanders, Calgary Flames, Buffalo Sabres, Minnesota Wild and Edmonton Oilers, two-time all-star
 Chad Ruhwedel, NHL player with the Pittsburgh Penguins
 Ben Walter, Former NHL player with the Boston Bruins, New York Islanders and New Jersey Devils
 Scott Waugh, Physical therapist with the Boston Bruins, Boston Red Sox and director at the Massachusetts General Hospital Sports Physical Therapy Service
 Scott Wilson, NHL player with the Buffalo Sabres

Notable Staff
Harry Lew (1884-1963) 1902 First African American professional basketball player, New England League, Pawtucketville Athletic Club, Lowell. Also 1922 Lowell Textile Institute (now UMass Lowell) Basketball Coach.

Athletic Directors
Dana Skinner (1987-2018)

Peter Casey (2018–present)

National Championships
The University of Massachusetts Lowell has won seven team NCAA Championships.

Team

References

External links